Frédéric Viseux (born 7 May 1971) is a retired French football defender.

References

1971 births
Living people
French footballers
ESA Brive players
Chamois Niortais F.C. players
Pau FC players
Amiens SC players
FC Sochaux-Montbéliard players
Lille OSC players
Stade Malherbe Caen players
CA Bastia players
Association football defenders